Cormorant is an unincorporated community in the Canadian province of Manitoba on the east shore of Cormorant Lake about 80 kilometres from The Pas. The community is in the west central region of the province. It has been an Aboriginal and First Nations campsite dating back to the 1900s. The post office in the community was established in July, 1928.

As of 2001 the community had a population of 400 in 139 households. Community services include local water supply, waste disposal, Cormorant School, Community hall, and Cormorant Lodge.

 
It is governed by a mayor and council.

Fishing, trapping and logging are the primary industries.

Cormorant is served by Via Rail's Winnipeg – Churchill rail line at the Cormorant railway station.

Demographics 

References 

Designated places in Manitoba
Northern communities in Manitoba